Leges (plural of Latin lex: law) may refer to:

Literature
 Laws (dialogue) Plato's last and longest dialogue

Ancient Roman law
 Leges regiae, early Roman laws introduced by the Kings of Rome
 Lex Julia (Leges Juliae), ancient Roman laws, introduced by any member of the Julian family
 Leges Clodiae, series of laws passed by the Plebeian Council of the Roman Republic 
 Leges provinciae, 146 BC laws concerning the regulation and administration of Roman  provinces
 Lex Antonia (Leges Antoniae), law established in ancient Rome in 44 BC
 Lex Licinia Sextia (Leges Liciniae Sextiae), Roman law which restored the consulship in 367 BCE

Laws in other governments
 Leges Henrici Primi, legal treatise, written circa 1115, on legal customs of medieval England
 Leges palatinae, laws governing the functioning of the royal court of the Kingdom of Majorca
 Leges Edwardi Confessoris, early twelfth-century English collection of 39 laws
 Leges Genuciae, laws proposed in 342 BCE by plebeian consul Lucius Genucius
 Leges barbarorum; see Early Germanic law
 Sacrae Disciplinae Leges, 1983 apostolic constitution by Pope John Paul II
 Leges inter Brettos et Scottos, legal codification under David I of Scotland
 Welsh law (Leges Walliae) 
 Edictum Rothari (Leges Langobardorum) 643 CE compilation of Lombard law

Phrases
 Inter arma enim silent leges ("In times of war, the law falls silent"), phrase attributed to Cicero
 Inter Arma Enim Silent Leges (Star Trek: Deep Space Nine), an episode of the series
 Leges sine Moribus vanae, motto of University of Pennsylvania

Other uses
 , a Roman Catholic titular bishopric in modern Algeria; see Numidia#Episcopal sees

See also
 Lex (disambiguation)
 Legibus (disambiguation)